Boris Aleksandrovich Arapov (12 September 1905 in Saint Petersburg – 27 January 1992 in Saint Petersburg) was a Soviet and Russian composer. People's Artist of the RSFSR (1976).

Life and career
Arapov grew up in Poltava, Ukraine, and received there his first musical instruction class. He moved to Petrograd (formerly Saint Petersburg) in 1921, and took piano lessons with Maria Yudina. However, a hand disease later forced him to abandon piano playing. His instruction class in composition started in 1923 at the Leningrad Conservatory, where he was taught by, amongst others, Vladimir Shcherbachov.

He later became a teacher at the conservatory, and a professor in 1940. In 1951, he became the director of the faculty for orchestration and the faculty of composition in 1976. He received titles of People's Artist of the RSFSR (1976) and Order of Lenin (1986). His students included the Georgian composer Dagmara Slianova-Mizandari.

Arapov oriented himself first of all towards the officially desirable composition style and worked primarily with nationalist elements, mainly restricting his subject matter to Russian folklore. However, from around 1960, his compositional style started to become more experimental, introducing a more complicated harmonic, rhythmic and sound colour. As subject matter, he more often selected works of literature. Although this later work is generally tonal, the levels of internal discord are higher than previously. In his very last works, Arapov introduced a religious subject matter.

Selected works

Orchestral
 Symphony No. 1 in C minor (1947)
 Symphony No. 2 in D major (1959)
 Symphony No. 3 (1963)
 Symphony No. 4 for voices, choir and orchestra (1975)
 Symphony No. 5 (1981)
 Symphony No. 6 for voices, choir and orchestra (1983)
 Symphony No. 7 (1991)
 Concerto for orchestra (1969)
 "Tajik Suite" (1938)
 "Russian Suite" (1951)
 Violin Concerto (1963/64)
 Concerto for violin, piano, percussion and chamber orchestra (1973)
 "The Revelation of St John" for cello, piano, percussion and string orchestra (1989)

Stage works and other vocal music
 "Hodja Nasreddin", comic opera (1944)
 "The frigate "Victory", opera with text by Alexander Pushkin (1959)
 "Rain", chamber opera from W. Somerset Maugham (1967)
 "The Picture of Dorian Gray", ballet from Oscar Wilde (1971)
 "Four Seasons", vocal cycle for soprano, tenor and nine instrumentals (1978)

Chamber music
 Trio with Mongolian themes, for clarinet, viola and piano (1938)
 Violin Sonata (1978)
 Cello Sonata (1985)
 Horn Sonata (1981)
 Sonata for solo violin (1930)
 Quintet for oboe, horn, harp, viola and cello (1979)

Piano music
 Piano Sonata No. 1 (1970)
 Piano Sonata No. 2 (1976)
 Piano Sonata No. 3 (1987)
 Piano Sonata No. 4 (1990)
 Piano Sonata No. 5 "De profundis" (1992)

References

1905 births
1992 deaths
Musicians from Saint Petersburg
People from Sankt-Peterburgsky Uyezd
Russian male classical composers
Soviet male composers
20th-century classical composers
20th-century Russian male musicians
Saint Petersburg Conservatory alumni
People's Artists of the RSFSR
Recipients of the Order of Lenin
Recipients of the Order of the Red Banner of Labour